Gordon Hugh Mawhinney (born 4 January 1943) is a former politician in Northern Ireland.

Mawhinney married Maureen Gribben (born 5 January 1943) on 4 April 1967.  In 1981, Mawhinney stood for the Alliance Party of Northern Ireland in Newtownabbey District "C", but was not elected.  He was elected to the Northern Ireland Assembly, 1982, in South Antrim.  He stood in the equivalent Westminster constituency at the 1983 general election, receiving 11.9% of the votes cast, and increased his share to 16.0% at the 1987 general election, in which he took second place.

In 1987, Mawhinney was elected as Deputy Leader of the Alliance Party, a position which he held until he resigned in 1991, claiming "health and business reasons".  In 1989, he finally won a seat on Newtownabbey Borough Council, in Manse Road In 1993, he won a seat in the successor district of University, but he did not restand in 1997.

References

1943 births
Living people
Members of Newtownabbey Borough Council
Alliance Party of Northern Ireland politicians
Northern Ireland MPAs 1982–1986
Alliance Party of Northern Ireland councillors